The 2015–16 Gibraltar Premier Division (known as the Argus Insurance Premier Division for sponsorship reasons) was the 117th season of the national amateur and semi-professional football league in Gibraltar since its establishment - the highest level of football in Gibraltar. The league was contested by ten clubs, expanded from eight clubs in the last two seasons, including all clubs from last season and two promoted clubs from 2014–15 Gibraltar Second Division. The winner of the Gibraltar Premier Division, Lincoln Red Imps was allocated a spot in Champions League qualification, and as they won the Rock Cup a spot in the Europa League was given to the runners-up Europa FC.

Lincoln Red Imps were the reigning champions, sealing a record 21st title last season. The Gibraltar football season kicked off with the Pepe Reyes Cup between Lincoln and Europa FC, which Lincoln won 3–2 after extra time. The season proper kicked off on the following Friday, September 25, with St Joseph's facing Lions.

Format
Each of the ten Premier Division teams will play each other three times for a total of 27 matches each. It is expected that the tenth-placed team will be relegated while the ninth-placed team from the Premier Division will enter a playoff with the second-placed team from the Second Division for a spot in the 2016–17 Premier Division.

Teams

After the 2014–15 season no teams were relegated, and both Gibraltar United and Angels were promoted as champions and runners-up of the 2014–15 Gibraltar Second Division, when the league expands to ten teams this season.

Notes

League table

Results

Matches 1–18
Teams play each other twice.

Matches 19–27
Teams play each other once.

Top goalscorers

Promotion/relegation play-off
At the end of the season, the ninth-placed team from the Premier Division, Britannia XI, entered a play-off with Mons Calpe, the second-placed team from the Second Division for a spot in the 2016–17 Premier Division. 

Mons Calpe are promoted to the 2016–17 Gibraltar Premier Division.

See also
2015–16 Gibraltar Second Division

References

External links
Season at soccerway.com
Gibraltar Football Association

Gibraltar Premier Division seasons
Gib
1